Hard at Play is the sixth album by American rock band Huey Lewis and the News. It was released in 1991 on EMI for most of the world and Chrysalis in the UK. Hard at Play peaked at number 27 on the Billboard 200 pop albums chart and produced two top 40 singles, "Couple Days Off" and "It Hit Me Like a Hammer".  Music videos were released for "It Hit Me like a Hammer", "Couple Days Off", and "He Don't Know".

Critical reception

In a review for AllMusic, Stephen Thomas Erlewine notes the "return to the straight-ahead blues-inflected pop/rock that made Huey Lewis and the News superstars in the early '80s" with Hard at Play.

Track listing 
"Build Me Up" (Johnny Colla, Huey Lewis) – 4:28
"It Hit Me Like a Hammer" (Robert "Mutt" Lange, Lewis) – 4:01
"Attitude" (Max Carl) – 4:00
"He Don't Know" (Don Covay, Jon Tiven, Sally Tiven) – 4:15
"Couple Days Off" (Chris Hayes, Lewis, Geoffrey Palmer) – 4:56
"That's Not Me" (Michael Ruff) – 4:15
"We Should Be Making Love" (Andy Goldmark, Steve Kipner, Steve Lindsey) – 4:01
"Best of Me" (Bonnie Hayes, Kevin Hayes, Annie Stocking) – 3:57
"Do You Love Me, Or What?" (C. Hayes, Lewis, Nick Lowe) – 3:46
"Don't Look Back" (Lewis, Bill Gibson, David Fredericks) – 3:44
"Time Ain't Money" (Colla, Lewis) – 4:46

Personnel 
Huey Lewis and the News

 Huey Lewis – harmonica, vocals
 Mario Cipollina – bass
 Johnny Colla – guitar, saxophone, backing vocals
 Bill Gibson – percussion, drums, backing vocals
 Chris Hayes – guitar, backing vocals
 Sean Hopper – keyboards, backing vocals

Additional personnel
 The Gospel Hummingbirds – backing vocals (4)
 David Fredericks – backing vocals (5, 10)
 Mike Duke – backing vocals (6)
 Michael Ruff – backing vocals (6)
 John McFee – guitar (11)

Production 

 Huey Lewis and the News – producers
 Bill Schnee – producer, engineer, mixing
  Eric "ET" Thorngren – co-producer (1, 5), additional engineer
 Bob Brown – executive producer
 Bob Edwards – additional engineer, assistant engineer 
 Jeffrey "Nik" Norman – additional engineer
 Ken Allardyce – assistant engineer, mix assistant
 Tony Eckert – assistant engineer
 Stephen Hart – assistant engineer
 Tim Lauber – assistant engineer
 Kevin Scott – assistant engineer
 Jim "Watts" Vereecke – assistant engineer
 Jack Joseph Puig – mixing
 Doug Sax – mastering at The Mastering Lab (Hollywood, CA).
 Henry Marquez – art direction
 Michael Diehl – design
 Aaron Rapoport – photography

Charts

Weekly charts

Year-end charts

Singles

Certifications

References 

1991 albums
Huey Lewis and the News albums
EMI Records albums
Chrysalis Records albums
Albums produced by Bill Schnee